CCGS Frederick G. Creed was a hydrographic survey vessel operated by the Canadian Coast Guard on behalf of the Canadian Hydrographic Service, a scientific agency of the Department of Fisheries and Oceans. The ship was built in 1988 by Swath Ocean Systems Incorporated of San Diego, California and entered service the same year. The ship was taken out of service in March 2020 and sold for scrap.

Design and description
CCGS Frederick G. Creed, constructed of aluminum, employed a SWATH system and was named after Frederick G. Creed, an inventor and pioneer of this technology. Frederick G. Creed was powered by two General Motors 12V92 geared diesel engines driving two shafts turning a fixed pitch propeller each. Frederick G. Creed had one  dry lab aboard and carried one manually-launched rigid-hulled inflatable boat. The vessel had a complement of four personnel, composed of one officer and three crew.

Construction and service
CCGS Frederick G. Creed was built in 1988 by Swath Ocean Systems at their yard in San Diego, California. The vessel entered service with the Canadian Coast Guard in 1989 and is registered in Ottawa, Ontario and rated as a Mid Shore Science Vessel. It was homeported in Rimouski, Quebec and was used to perform surveys of the Laurentian and Maritimes regions. Frederick G. Creed was sent to Cape Hatteras to perform wave dynamic studies. In March 2020, the vessel was declared surplus and sold for scrap. Demolition was completed in December 2020.

Notes

Citations

References
 
 

Ships of the Canadian Coast Guard
Small waterplane area twin hull vessels
Ships built in San Diego
1988 ships
Military catamarans